Gordana Kamenarović (born 1958) is a  Serbian actress.

Born in Novi Sad, in what was then Yugoslavia, she graduated acting from the Academy of Arts in Novi Sad, and became a member of the Serbian National Theatre in the same city. She played many roles in the Serbian National Theatre and other theatres, as well as TV dramas, TV series, radio-dramas, featured and short movies.

She is a member of the Association of Dramatic Artists of Vojvodina

Theatre roles
"Femka from Futog", Migrations, Miloš Crnjanski, director Vida Ognjenović;
"Mrs. Susic", Ujez, Branislav Nušić, director Radoslav Milenković;
"First Lady", Zoya's Apartment, Mikhail Bulgakov, director Dejan Mijac;
"Nellie", The Secret Diary of Virginia Woolf, author and director Milena Pavlovic;
"Mrs. Lugomirski", Was there a Prince's Supper, author and director Vida Ognjenović;
"Lydmila", The Oginski Polonaise, Nikolai Koloyada, director Ana Ivanovic;
"Her Mother", Skocidjevojka, Maja Pelevic, director Kokan Mladenovic;
"Ana Nikolayeva Antipova", Uncle's Dream, Fyodor Dostoevsky, director Egon Savin;
"Olga Mitrovic", Too Much of an Inheritance, Vladimir Paskaljevic, director Filip Markovinovic;
"Yente", Fiddler on the Roof, Jerry Bock / Joseph Stein, director Voja Soldatovic;
"Renne", The Orchestra, Jean Anouilh, director Voja Soldatovic;
"Molly", Casanova, David Greig, director Djurdja Tesic;
"Mir-Jam", Ranjeni orao, Mir-Jam, director Stojan Cerović;
"Patricia", Extremities, William Mastrosimone, director Aleksandar Gajin;
"Natalia Sorina", The Sea Gull, Anton Chekhov, director Zanko Tomic;
"Magda Stepanov", Faith and Treason, Aleksandar Tišma, director Dušan Petrović;
"Jelena", In the Flame of Passion, Ivan M. Lalic, director Zanko Tomic;
"Fire Chief", The Bald Soprano, Eugène Ionesco, director Zlatko Pakovic;
"Mrs. Bayer", Oxymoron, Svetislav Basara, director Dušan Petrović;
"Natalia Stepanovna", Half a Century Later, Anton Chekhov, The Proposal + The Bear + The Anniversary, director Ljuboslav Majera;
"Malcika", Kad bi Sombor bio Holivud, author and director Radoslav Doric;
"Jagoda", A Miracle in Sargan Ljubomir Simović, director Egon Savin;
"Savina", Fathers and Forefathers, Slobodan Selenic, director Slavenko Saletovic;
"Queen Ana", The Bewitched, Peter Barnes, director Goran Vukcevic;
"Doctor", Urge, Franz Xaver Kroetz, director IvanaVujic;
"Misyr", King Lear, William Shakespeare, director Ljubisa Ristic;
"Dove", Druga vrata levo, Aleksandar Popović, director Suada Kapic;
"Maggie Soldignac", An Absolute Turkey, Georges Feydeau, director Zelimir Oreskovic;
"Jelena", Deveta defanziva, Stevan Koprivica, director Vladimir Lazić;
"Masa", Narrentanz, Leo Birinski, director Vida Ognjenović;
"Natalia", The Petty Bourgeois, Maxim Gorky, director Dr. Vlatko Perkovic;
"Kaca", Three Hammers (Not to Mention the Sickle) , Deana Leskovar, director Egon Savin;
"Miss Moon", A Novel about London, Miloš Crnjanski, director Stevo Žigon;
"Jenny Diver", Bilbao Ball, after "The Beggar's Opera" by Bertolt Brecht, director Zoran Tasic;
"Ardelia", Zivot provincijskih plejboja izmedju dva rata, Dusan Jovanović, director Branislav Micunovic;
"Pia", Crime on Goat-Island, Ugo Betti, director Slavenko Saletovic;
"Carmen", Mela, Dacia Maraini, director Voja Soldatovic;
"Bertha", Comrades, August Strindberg, director Attila Andrasi;
"Performer", Cantata Vojvodina, Miroslav Antić, composer Rudolf Bruci, conductor Mladen Jagust;
"Rosalind", As You Like It, William Shakespeare, director Zlatko Sviben;
"Maturin", Don Juan, Molière, director Ljubisa Georgijevski;
"Hermia", A Midsummer Night's Dream, William Shakespeare, director Stevo Žigon;
"Host", Mario and the Magician, Thomas Mann, director Radoslav Milenković;
"Aleksandra Ivanovna", Platonov, Anton Chekhov, director Stevo Žigon;
"Narrator", Captain John Piplfoks, Duško Radović, director Zlatko Sviben;
"Vladislava Cutukovic", Ravangrad, Veljko Petrović – Djordje Lebovic, director Dejan Mijac;
"Saveta", Izbiracica, Kosta Trifković, director Slavenko Saletovic;
"Paulina Tornjanski", Dolnja Zemlja, Jakov Ignjatović – Djordje Lebovic, director Dejan Mijac;
"Mrs. Stahler", Farmyard, Franz Xaver Kroetz, directors Zlatko Sviben and Milan Pletel;
"Vida", Slike zalosnih doživljaja, Milica Novkovic, director Slobodan Unkovski;

Directed for theatre
Mihovil Logar,  Pokondirena tikva / A Swank (comic opera), Serbian National Theatre;

Movies
2018 – Grande Punto - Proročica
2004 – Dobro jutro maligna celijo / Good Morning Malignant Cell (short movie), director Marin Malesevic, Kino klub Novi Sad;
2003 – Zvezdan (short movie), director Filip Markovinovic, Kino klub Novi Sad;
1998 – Kud plovi ovaj brod / Wanderlust (feature film), director Želimir Žilnik, Terra film, Novi Sad;

Television
2019 – Nek ide život (TV series), director Slobodan Šuljagić
1987 – Poslednje leto detinjstva (TV series), Rade Obrenovic, director Borivoje Gvojic, TV Novi Sad;
1985 – Nas ucitelj IV razreda (TV drama), Veljko Petrović, director Branko Mitic, TV Novi Sad;
1984 – Bele udovice / Grass Widows (TV drama), Maja Volk, director Djordje Dedjanski, TV Novi Sad;
1984 – Jesen Djure Drazetica (TV movie), Aleksandar Tišma, director Jan Makan TV Novi Sad;
1981 – Kir Janja (TV drama), Jovan Sterija Popović, director Dejan Mijac, TV Beograd;

Awards
The Annual Award of Radio Novi Sad for the season 1982;
Best actress for the role of "Maturin" in Don Juan at the Vojvodina Theatre Meetings, Pančevo, 1985;
Best actress for the role of "Natalia Stepanovna" in Half a Century Later at the Vojvodina Theatre Meetings, Sombor, 1994;
The Annual Award of the Serbian National Theatre for the best achievement in the season 1993/94, for the role of "Natalia Stepanovna" in Half a Century Ago

External links

Serbian National Theatre profile

1958 births
Living people
Actors from Novi Sad
Serbian actresses
Serbian stage actresses
Serbian television actresses